The 2014 World Mountain Running Championships was the 30th edition of the global mountain running competition, World Mountain Running Championships, organised by the World Mountain Running Association and was held in Casette di Massa, Italy on 14 September 2014.

Results

References

External links
 World Mountain Running Association official web site

World Mountain Running Championships
World Long Distance Mountain Running